Luis María Moreno Perpiñá is a Spanish lightweight rower. He won a gold medal at the 1983 World Rowing Championships in Duisburg with the lightweight men's four.

References

Year of birth missing (living people)
Living people
Spanish male rowers
World Rowing Championships medalists for Spain
20th-century Spanish people